Jkvr. Karin Hildur "Kajsa" Ollongren (born 28 May 1967) is a Dutch-Swedish politician serving as the Netherlands' Minister of Defence since 10 January 2022. A member of the Democrats 66 (D66), she previously served as Minister of the Interior and Kingdom Relations and second Deputy Prime Minister in the third Rutte cabinet (2017–2022), and briefly as Mayor of Amsterdam (October 2017).

Early life and education
Ollongren was born on 28 May 1967 in Leiden to Jhr. Alexander Ollongren, a Dutch East Indies-born astronomer and computer scientist, and his Swedish wife Gunvor Lundgren. The Dutch Ollongren, originating from the Russian branch of the Finnish-Swedish noble family (originally named Ållongren), was incorporated into the untitled Dutch nobility in 2002, thereby giving her the noble predicate "jonkvrouw". Because of her Swedish mother, she also has Swedish citizenship.

Ollongren grew up in Oegstgeest, where she attended the secondary school Rijnlands Lyceum between 1979 and 1985. She then went to the University of Amsterdam, where she initially studied economics between 1985 and 1986, but switched her field of study in 1986 to history, in which she obtained an M.A. degree in 1991. She subsequently studied public administration at the École nationale d'administration in Paris and foreign relations at the Netherlands Institute of International Relations Clingendael.

Career in the civil service
Ollongren started her career in the civil service at the Ministry of Economic Affairs, becoming a policymaker in the area of Central and Eastern Europe there in 1992, in which capacity she trained young political parties of the newly established democracies in the area. She was head of parliamentary affairs within the ministry until 2001, and director of European Integration and Strategy from 2001 to 2004, and became Deputy Director General of the ministry in 2004.

In 2007, Ollongren moved to the Ministry of General Affairs, the department headed by the Prime Minister, becoming Deputy Secretary General. She became Secretary General of the ministry in 2011.

Political career

Local politics
After the 2014 local election, in which the Democrats 66 became the largest party of Amsterdam and entered the city's government, Ollongren became an alderwoman and first deputy mayor in Amsterdam, taking office on 18 June 2014. Her portfolio as alderwoman was extensive, including economic affairs, seaport, airport, participation, art, culture, local media, monuments and the city centre.

On 18 September 2017, the city's mayor Eberhard van der Laan announced in an open letter to the people of Amsterdam that he would step back from his public responsibilities due to ill health, leaving Ollongren to exercise these responsibilities in his stead from 19 September onward. The day after his death, on 6 October, Ollongren became acting Mayor of Amsterdam.

Minister of the Interior, 2017–2022
On 26 October 2017, Ollongren was appointed as Minister of the Interior and Kingdom Relations in Prime Minister Mark Rutte's third cabinet, succeeding Ronald Plasterk. She also became the second of the cabinet's three Deputy Prime Ministers, serving alongside Hugo de Jonge and Carola Schouten. From 1 November 2019 to 14 April 2020, she was on medical leave of absence.

Following the 2021 general election, Ollongren (D66) and Annemarie Jorritsma of the People's Party for Freedom and Democracy (VVD) led the  initial exploratory talks of the government formation. Both of them stepped down on 25 March 2021 after Ollongren was photographed carrying notes with confidential information visible. The talks had been suspended earlier that day, because Ollongren had tested positive for COVID-19.

Minister of Defence, 2022–present
Early in her tenure, Ollongren agreed to a Ukrainian request to supply 200 FIM-92 Stinger air defence rockets and 50 Panzerfaust 3 anti-tank systems with 400 rockets in response to the 2022 Russian invasion of Ukraine.

Personal life
Ollongren is married to television producer . The couple have two children.

References

External links

1967 births
Living people
20th-century Dutch civil servants
20th-century Dutch politicians
20th-century Dutch women politicians
21st-century Dutch civil servants
21st-century Dutch politicians
21st-century Dutch women politicians
Aldermen of Amsterdam
Democrats 66 politicians
Deputy Prime Ministers of the Netherlands
Dutch people of Finnish descent
Dutch people of Russian descent
Dutch people of Swedish descent
École nationale d'administration alumni
Female defence ministers
Female interior ministers
Jonkvrouws of the Netherlands
Lesbian politicians
LGBT cabinet members of the Netherlands
LGBT mayors of places in the Netherlands
Mayors of Amsterdam
Ministers of Defence of the Netherlands
Ministers of Kingdom Relations of the Netherlands
Ministers of the Interior of the Netherlands
People from Leiden
University of Amsterdam alumni
Women government ministers of the Netherlands
Women mayors of places in the Netherlands